Firing Line is an American public affairs show founded and hosted by conservative William F. Buckley Jr.

This is a list of episodes that aired originally from 1966 to 1999.

Episodes

1960s

1970s

1980s

1990s

References

External links
 

Lists of American non-fiction television series episodes